La Razón is a Bolivian daily newspaper published in La Paz. The newspaper began publication on 1917.

References

External links 

 Animales S.O.S Bolivia

Mass media in La Paz
Newspapers published in Bolivia
Publications established in 1917
Spanish-language newspapers